Syed Hossain Mansur, also known by his daak naam Tara Mia, was a Bangladesh Nationalist Party politician and former Member of Parliament for the Pabna-7 constituency. He also served as a member of the 3rd National Assembly of Pakistan. Mansur served in the national assembly's standing committee on external affairs and was a prominent leader of the Awami League in the East Pakistan period.

Early life and family
Mansur was born to a Bengali Muslim family of Syeds from Shahzadpur in Sirajganj, Pabna District, Bengal Presidency.

Career
In 1962, Mansur was elected to the 3rd National Assembly of Pakistan as a representative of the Pabna-II constituency. He was elected again during the 1970 East Pakistan Provincial Assembly election, as an Awami League candidate. In 1979, he was elected to the Jatiya Sangsad from Pabna-7 as a Bangladesh Nationalist Party candidate.

References

Bangladesh Nationalist Party politicians
Pakistani MNAs 1962–1965
2nd Jatiya Sangsad members
Year of birth missing (living people)
Bangladeshi people of Arab descent
People from Sirajganj District